Matthew Lamont "Mac" Colville (January 8, 1916 – May 27, 2003) was a professional ice hockey right winger. He played for the New York Rangers between 1935 and 1947, winning the Stanley Cup in 1940.

A native of Edmonton, Alberta, he was brother of Hall of Fame hockey player Neil Colville.

Legacy
In the 2009 book 100 Ranger Greats, the authors ranked Colville at No. 55 all-time of the 901 New York Rangers who had played during the team's first 82 seasons.

Career statistics

Regular season and playoffs

Honors and awards
 EAHL First All-Star Team, 1935
 Won the Stanley Cup in 1940 with the New York Rangers

References

External links

1916 births
2003 deaths
Canadian military personnel from Manitoba
Canadian Army personnel
Canadian Army personnel of World War II
Canadian expatriates in the United States
Canadian ice hockey right wingers
Edmonton Flyers (WHL) players
New Haven Ramblers players
New York Crescents players
New York Rangers players
Ottawa Senators (QSHL) players
Philadelphia Ramblers players
Ice hockey people from Edmonton
Stanley Cup champions
Vancouver Canucks (WHL) players